The Pleasure Seekers was a 1960s-era, all-female rock band from Detroit, Michigan. The band morphed into Cradle, changing direction musically. They are known due in large part to the later prominence of band member Suzi Quatro.

Name
According to Suzi Quatro in her memoir Unzipped, the sisters searched a dictionary for a name for their band. Upon encountering "hedonist", they used the definition "pleasure seeker" to create "The Pleasure Seekers".

History

Biography
During May 1964 The Pleasure Seekers were formed by Patti Quatro in Detroit, Michigan. The original lineup included lead singers Suzi Quatro and Patti Quatro (born 10 March 1948) with Nancy Ball on drums, guitarist Mary Lou Ball and Diane Baker on piano. Leo Fenn, the husband of Arlene Quatro (born 1941), was the band's manager. Patti eventually asked Dave Leone to give them a spot at his teen night club, The Hideout. He put them on stage two weeks later, and they soon became well known at the venue. They gained momentum in the burgeoning Detroit rock community, playing concerts and teen clubs with Ted Nugent, Bob Seger and others.

The band's first record was released on the Hideout Records label in 1965, when Suzi Quatro and sister Patti Quatro were 15 and 17 years old, respectively. Both sides of their first single, "Never Thought You'd Leave Me" b/w "What a Way to Die", have some prominence. The former is included on Highs in the Mid-Sixties, Volume 6, while the latter was covered by "The Mummies" in the 1988 cult film Blood Orgy of the Leather Girls. Both songs, with lyrics by Dave Leone, are included on the compilation album Friday at the Hideout, a Hideout Records retrospective that charted regionally.

During early 1966, Sheryl 'Sherry' Hammerlee joined the band on rhythm guitar and Arlene Quatro replaced Diane Baker on piano. In October that year Darline Arnone joined the band. Pami Bedford also joined in August 1967, replacing Hammerlee.

In 1968, they became one of the earliest all-female rock bands to sign with a major label, Mercury Records. They released a second single, "Light of Love" b/w "Good Kind of Hurt", with both songs charting. The group matured into a dynamic show band and toured the US. Their show featured a Sgt. Pepper/Magical Mystery Tour revue, as well as a Motown sound revue. The show incorporated one of the earliest light shows.

Cradle

In 1969, The Pleasure Seekers morphed into Cradle, changing direction musically in writing heavier original material and touring the US. Arlene was now manager and sister Nancy Quatro (born 1953) had joined as vocalist and percussionist. The group toured vigorously, playing concerts and pop festivals throughout the US with popular bands of the day, ending with a tour of Vietnam.  In 1971, Suzi was signed by producer Mickie Most to his RAK Records label, leaving for the UK and solo fame as Suzi Quatro. Jerry Nolan later of the New York Dolls drummed with the band in the months leading up to Suzi's departure.   Patti continued with sister Nancy in Cradle, then joined brother Mike's MQ Jam Band, co-producing and recording an album, Look Deeply into the Mirror.

Current
The Quatro sisters have reunited for special TV and concert projects through the years, reminiscent of the early Pleasure Seekers days.

Patti currently runs Cradle Rocks Publishing with sister Nancy, and is involved in restoring the original, never released catalogue of Pleasure Seekers and Cradle music.

The History, a newly remastered album of music from Cradle was released in 2010.

What a Way to Die, a newly remastered album of music from The Pleasure Seekers was released in 2011.

Personal life
Arlene Quatro and Leo Fenn are married and have a daughter, actress Sherilyn Fenn. Arlene Quatro left the music business, authoring a book on health and becoming involved in environmental issues.

Nancy Quatro turned to music management, forming N. Glass Management and managing the band Overscene.

In 1974, Patti Quatro (now Patti Ericson) joined Fanny, appearing on their Rock and Roll Survivors album and two singles, "I've Had It" and "Butter Boy", which reached No. 29 nationally.  Patti left Fanny in 1975. She continued to pursue studio work on several albums, musical side projects and modeling.

Suzi Quatro became popular in Europe, enjoying a successful long-lasting music career. She sold over 55 million records and remains active as a touring and recording artist. She also branched out as a TV actress, stage actress, radio DJ and author. She is known for her role as Leather Tuscadero in the TV show Happy Days.

Discography

Singles
 "Never Thought You'd Leave Me" (1965), Hideout Records
 "Light of Love" (1968), Mercury Records

Compilation albums
 Friday at the Hideout (date unknown), Hideout Records
 Highs in the Mid-Sixties, Volume 6 (1984), AIP Records – a picture of The Pleasure Seekers appears on the cover of the album.
 The History (2010), Cradle – distributed by CD Baby
 What a Way to Die (2011), The Pleasure Seekers – distributed by CD Baby

References

External links
 The Pleasure Seekers band info
 Suzi Quatro
 Patti Quatro Ericson twitter
 Patti Quatro Ericson facebook
 Quatrorock YouTube
 QuatroRock
Mickey Quatro
Art Quatro

All-female punk bands
Garage rock groups from Michigan
Musical groups from Detroit
Musical groups established in 1964